E